This is a list of National Hockey League (NHL) players who have played at least one game in the NHL from 1917 to present and have a last name that starts with "C".

List updated as of the 2020–21 NHL season.

Ca

Nicholas Caamano
Jack Caffery
Terry Caffery
Drake Caggiula
Larry Cahan
Charles Cahill
Herbert Cain
Jim "Dutch" Cain
Don Cairns
Eric Cairns
Petr Cajanek
Eric Calder
Kyle Calder
Ryan Caldwell
Don Caley
Norm Calladine
Ryan Callahan
Drew Callander
Jock Callander
Brett Callighen
Frank "Patsy" Callighen
Jan Caloun
Matt Calvert
Jim Camazzola
Tony Camazzola
Al Cameron
Angus "Scotty" Cameron
Billy Cameron
Craig Cameron
Dave Cameron
Harry Cameron
Mike Cammalleri
Matt Campanale
Andrew Campbell
Brian Campbell
Bryan Campbell
Colin Campbell
Darcy Campbell
Dave Campbell
Don Campbell
Earl "Spiff" Campbell
Gregory Campbell
Jack Campbell
Jim Campbell
Scott Campbell
Wade Campbell
Tod Campeau
Dominic Campedelli
Carter Camper
Chris Campoli
Patrick Cannone
Kyle Capobianco
Frank Caprice
Dave Capuano
Jack Capuano
Luca Caputi
Leo Carbol
Guy Carbonneau
Daniel Carcillo
Mike Card
Claude Cardin
Steve Cardwell
George Carey
Jim Carey
Matt Carey
Paul Carey
Matt Carkner
Terry Carkner
Mathieu Carle
Matt Carle
Wayne Carleton
Brian Carlin
Brandon Carlo
Jack Carlson
John Carlson
Kent Carlson
Steve Carlson
Anders Carlsson
Gabriel Carlsson
Lucas Carlsson
Randy Carlyle
Patrik Carnback
Keith Carney
Alain Caron
Jacques Caron
Jordan Caron
Sebastien Caron
Bobby Carpenter
Eddie Carpenter
Ryan Carpenter
Al Carr
Daniel Carr
Gene Carr
Lorne Carr
Connor Carrick
Sam Carrick
Trevor Carrick
Alexandre Carrier
William Carrier
Larry Carriere
Gene Carrigan
Billy Carroll
George Carroll
Greg Carroll
Dwight Carruthers
Bill Carse
Bob Carse
Bill Carson
Brett Carson
Frank Carson
Gerald Carson
Jimmy Carson
Lindsay Carson
Anson Carter
Billy Carter
Jeff Carter
John Carter
Lyle Carter
Ron Carter
Ryan Carter
Michael Caruso
Joe Carveth
Jon Casey
Wayne Cashman
Mike Casselman
Andrew Cassels
Bruce Cassidy
Tom Cassidy
Frederic Cassivi
Tony Cassolato
Daniel Catenacci
Jackson Cates
Cole Caufield
Jay Caufield
Gino Cavallini
Paul Cavallini
Tom Cavanagh
Colby Cave

Ce–Ch

Cody Ceci
Roman Cechmanek
Peter Cehlarik
Sebastien Centomo
Ray Ceresino
Erik Černák
Frantisek Cernik
Roman Cervenka
Frederic Chabot
John Chabot
Lorne Chabot
Thomas Chabot
John Chad
Ed Chadwick
William "Chick" Chalmers
Milan Chalupa
Erwin Chamberlain
Shawn Chambers
Andre Champagne
Bob Champoux
Rene Chapdelaine
Art Chapman
Blair Chapman
Brian Chapman
Michael Chaput
Zdeno Chara
Jose Charbonneau
Stephane Charbonneau
Bob Charlebois
Todd Charlesworth
Sebastien Charpentier
Eric Charron
Guy Charron
Dave Chartier
Rourke Chartier
Brad Chartrand
Rick Chartraw
Kelly Chase
Denis Chasse
Jalen Chatfield
Vladimir Chebaturkin
Lude Check
Jonathan Cheechoo
Gerry Cheevers
Ivan Chekhovich
Chris Chelios
Jake Chelios
Mike Chernoff
Rich Chernomaz
Dick Cherry
Don Cherry
Denis Chervyakov
Tim Cheveldae
Real Chevrefils
Alain Chevrier
Ben Chiarot
Alex Chiasson
Steve Chiasson
Igor Chibirev
Andrei Chibisov
Dan Chicoine
Jason Chimera
Rick Chinnick
Kyle Chipchura
Ron Chipperfield
Art Chisholm
Colin Chisholm
Lex Chisholm
Stanislav Chistov
Filip Chlapik
Sasha Chmelevski
Dennis Cholowski
Marc Chorney
Taylor Chorney
Tom Chorske
Eric Chouinard
Guy Chouinard
Jean Chouinard
Marc Chouinard
Erik Christensen
Dave Christian
Jeff Christian
Mike Christie
Ryan Christie
Steve Christoff
Bob Chrystal
Artem Chubarov
Kris Chucko
Brad Church
Jack Church
Shane Churla
Jakob Chychrun
Jeff Chychrun
Dean Chynoweth
Filip Chytil
Dave Chyzowski

Ci–Cl

Peter Ciavaglia
Martin Cibak
Dino Ciccarelli
Enrico Ciccone
Chris Cichocki
Ivan Ciernik
Jozef Cierny
Hank Ciesla
Zdeno Ciger
Tony Cimellaro
Robert Cimetta
Joe Cirella
Anthony Cirelli
Jason Cirone
Marian Cisar
Casey Cizikas
Kim Clackson
Fredrik Claesson
Kale Clague
Francis "King" Clancy
Terry Clancy
Aubrey "Dit" Clapper
Brett Clark
Chris Clark
Dan Clark
Dean Clark
Gordie Clark
Mat Clark
Wendel Clark
Bobby Clarke
Dale Clarke
David Clarkson
Greg Classen
Daniel Cleary
Odie Cleghorn
Sprague Cleghorn
Bill Clement
Scott Clemmensen
Adam Clendening
Marc-Andre Cliche
Chris Clifford
Kyle Clifford
Connor Clifton
Matt Climie
Bruce Cline
Steve Clippingdale
Grant Clitsome
Dan Cloutier
Jacques Cloutier
Real Cloutier
Rejean Cloutier
Roland Cloutier
Sylvain Cloutier
Ryane Clowe
Rich Clune
Wally Clune
Cal Clutterbuck
Ben Clymer

Co

Gary Coalter
Steve Coates
Braydon Coburn
Glen Cochrane
Paul Coffey
Hugh Coflin
Dylan Coghlan
Andrew Cogliano
Colby Cohen
Carlo Colaiacovo
Joe Colborne
Danton Cole
Erik Cole
Ian Cole
Blake Coleman
Gerald Coleman
Kevin Colley
Tom Colley
Norman "Dodger" Collings
Bill Collins
Gary Collins
Rob Collins
Sean Collins
Jeremy Colliton
Bob Collyard
Mike Colman
Ross Colton
Mac Colville
Neil Colville
Les Colvin
Les Colwill
Blake Comeau
Rey Comeau
Mike Commodore
J. T. Compher
Eric Comrie
Mike Comrie
Paul Comrie
Max Comtois
Brian Conacher
Charlie Conacher
Cory Conacher
Jim Conacher
Lionel Conacher
Pat Conacher
Pete Conacher
Roy Conacher
Tim Conboy
Mike Condon
Erik Condra
Ty Conklin
Maitland "Red" Conn
Rob Conn
Kevin Connauton
Alex Connell
Bert Connelly
Wayne Connelly
Chris Conner
Brett Connolly
Mike Connolly
Tim Connolly
Cam Connor
Harry Connor
Kyle Connor
Bobby Connors
Al Conroy
Craig Conroy
Joe Contini
Brandon Convery
Eddie Convey
Alex "Bud" Cook
Bill Cook
Bob Cook
Frederick "Bun" Cook
Lloyd Cook
Tom Cook
Matt Cooke
Carson Cooper
David Cooper
Ed Cooper
Hal Cooper
Joe Cooper
 Pheonix Copley
Andrew Copp
Bob Copp
Bert Corbeau
Rene Corbet
Mike Corbett
Norm Corcoran
Jared Coreau
Bob Corkum
Patrice Cormier
Roger Cormier
Philippe Cornet
Mark Cornforth
Frank Corrado
Matthew Corrente
Charles Corrigan
Mike Corrigan
Chris Corrinet
Andre Corriveau
Yvon Corriveau
Jim Corsi
Daniel Corso
Shayne Corson
Joe Corvo
Ross Cory
Jacques Cossette
Les Costello
Murray Costello
Rich Costello
Charlie Cotch
Alain Cote (born 1957)
Alain Cote (born 1967)
Jean-Philippe Cote
Patrick Cote
Ray Cote
Riley Cote
Sylvain Cote
Harold "Baldy" Cotton
John Coughlin
Tim Coulis
Patrick Coulombe
D'Arcy Coulson
Arthur Coulter
Neal Coulter
Thomas Coulter
Yvan Cournoyer
Maurice Courteau
Yves Courteau
Ed Courtenay
Geoff Courtnall
Russ Courtnall
Larry Courville
Marcel Cousineau
Nick Cousins
Billy Coutu
Gerry Couture
Logan Couture
Rosario Couture
Sean Couturier
Sylvain Couturier
Jeff Cowan
Jared Cowen
Bruce Cowick
Rob Cowie
Bill Cowley
Wayne Cowley
Abbie Cox
Danny Cox
Craig Coxe
Charlie Coyle
Dylan Cozens

Cr

Joey Crabb
Adam Cracknell
Jim Craig
Mike Craig
Ryan Craig
John Craighead
Dale Craigwell
Joseph Cramarossa
Bart Crashley
Murray Craven
Bob Crawford
Bobby Crawford
Corey Crawford
Jack Crawford
Lou Crawford
Marc Crawford
Rusty Crawford
Adam Creighton
Dave Creighton
Jimmy Creighton
Dave Cressman
Glen Cressman
Andrew Crescenzi
Jiri Crha
Kyle Criscuolo
Terry Crisp
Ed Cristofoli
Maurice Croghan
B. J. Crombeen
Mike Crombeen
Shawn Cronin
Sidney Crosby
Cory Cross
Tommy Cross
Stanley Crossett
Doug Crossman
Gary Croteau
Lawson Crouse
Bruce Crowder
Keith Crowder
Troy Crowder
Phil Crowe
Mike Crowley
Ted Crowley
Greg Crozier
Joe Crozier
Roger Crozier
Nels Crutchfield

Cu–Cz

Wilf Cude
Jim Culhane
Barry Cullen
Brian Cullen
David Cullen
John Cullen
Mark Cullen
Matt Cullen
Ray Cullen
Jassen Cullimore
Tyler Cuma
Barry Cummins
Jim Cummins
Kyle Cumiskey
Mark Cundari
Randy Cunneyworth
Bob Cunningham
Craig Cunningham
Jim Cunningham
Les Cunningham
Bill Cupolo
Brian Curran
Dan Currie
Glen Currie
Hugh Currie
Josh Currie
Tony Currie
Floyd Curry
John Curry
Tony Curtale
Paul Curtis
Ian Cushenan
Jean Cusson
Jakub Cutta
Don Cutts
Claude Cyr
Denis Cyr
Paul Cyr
Austin Czarnik
Mariusz Czerkawski
Kevin Czuczman

See also
 hockeydb.com NHL Player List - C

Players